Richland may refer to:

Places in the United States
(by state)
Richland, California
Richland, Georgia
Richland County, Illinois
Richland, Rush County, Indiana
Richland, Iowa
Richland, Michigan
Richland, Mississippi (disambiguation)
Richland, Missouri
Richland County, Montana
Richland, Nebraska
Richland, New Jersey
Richland, New York
Richland County, North Dakota
Richland County, Ohio
Richland, Oregon
Richland, Pennsylvania
Richland County, South Carolina
Richland, South Dakota
Richland, Tennessee
Richland, Texas
Richland, Washington
Richland, Richland County, Wisconsin
Richland, Rusk County, Wisconsin
Richland County, Wisconsin
Richland Creek (disambiguation)
Richland Township (disambiguation)

Education in the United States
Richland Community College, Decatur, Illinois
Richland College, Dallas, Texas, a community college
Richland High School (disambiguation)
Richland School District (disambiguation)

Places on the United States National Register of Historic Places
Richland Plantation, Norwood, Louisiana
Richland (Harwood, Maryland), a home
Richland (Church Hill, Mississippi)
Richland (Blaine, Tennessee)

Other uses

Richland Correctional Institution, Mansfield, Richland County, Ohio
AMD Richland APU architecture

See also
Richlands (disambiguation)
Ridgeland (disambiguation)